A total solar eclipse will occur on Wednesday, September 3, 2081. A solar eclipse occurs when the Moon passes between Earth and the Sun, thereby totally or partly obscuring the image of the Sun for a viewer on Earth. A total solar eclipse occurs when the Moon's apparent diameter is larger than the Sun's, blocking all direct sunlight, turning day into darkness. Totality occurs in a narrow path across Earth's surface, with the partial solar eclipse visible over a surrounding region thousands of kilometres wide. The path of totality will begin at the Atlantic Ocean, off European mainland at 07:26:49 UTC and will end at Indonesian island of Java at 10:43:03 UTC.

Countries and territories experiencing totality 
 Guernsey
 Jersey
 France
 Switzerland
 Germany
 Liechtenstein
 Austria
 Italy
 Slovenia
 Croatia
 Hungary
 Bosnia and Herzegovina
 Serbia
 Romania
 Bulgaria
 Turkey
 Syria
 Iraq
 Iran
 Kuwait
 Saudi Arabia
 Bahrain
 Qatar
 United Arab Emirates
 Oman
 Maldives
 Indonesia

Major cities
 Paris

Related eclipses

Solar eclipses 2080–2083

Saros 136

Inex series

Notes

References

2081 09 03
2081 in science
2081 09 03
2081 09 03